Villalonga is a locality belonging to the Patagones Partido, in the extreme southwest of Buenos Aires Province, Argentina.

References 

Populated places in Buenos Aires Province